A Riddling Tale is a German fairy tale collected by the Brothers Grimm in Grimm's Fairy Tales.

It is Aarne-Thompson type 407, the girl as a flower.  The tale portion of it is subordinate to the riddle, and the tale is not widely found in the oral tradition.

Synopsis

Story and riddle
Three women were changed to identical flowers.  One was allowed home at night and told her husband to pick and free her.  He did so.

How did he recognize her?

Answer
The other flowers, having been in the field all night, had dew on them; the wife did not. so for that he would know that's her

References

Grimms' Fairy Tales
Fiction about shapeshifting
Riddles
Fictional plants
ATU 400-459